Selma is a feminine name of ambiguous origin. It could be a form of Selima, which in turn is a name first recorded in a poem by Thomas Gray (died 1771). One possibility is that Selima was influenced by the Arabic name Selim meaning "peaceful". In Turkey the name is a variation of the Arabic female name Salma.
The name may also have Celtic origins, in which case it means "beautiful view".

The use of Selma in Germany and Scandinavia stems from the Ossianic poetry of James Macpherson (died 1796), where it appears as a place name. Its specific popularity in Sweden is likely due to the Selma poems of Frans Michael Franzén (died 1847). It was later introduced into Denmark by Swedish immigrants, after which it likely became more common due to the works of the author Selma Lagerlöf (died 1940). The given name lost popularity in Sweden during most of the 20th century, but has had an upswing since the 1990s. In 1999, it joined the list of 100 most common names for Swedish female infants, and in 2017 and 2018, it was in the 16th place.

Given name
Selma Bajrami (born 1980), Bosnian singer
Selma Björnsdóttir (born 1974), Icelandic singer, 1999 and 2005 representative in the Eurovision Song Contest
Selma Blair (born 1972), American actress
Selma Botman (born 1950), American academic
Selma Chalabi, British filmmaker
Selma Cronan (1913–2002), American aviator
Selma Diamond (1917–2008), American actress
Selma Dritz (1920–1985), American physician and epidemiologist
Selma Ergeç (born 1978), Turkish-German actress and model
Selma Ek (1856–1941), Swedish opera singer
Selma Freud (1877–?), Austrian physicist
Selma Giöbel (1843–1925), Swedish artist
Selma Gräfin von der Gröben (1856–1938), German women's rights activist 
Salma Hayek (born 1966), Mexican and American actress and producer
Selma Jacobsson (1841–1899), Swedish photographer
Selma James (born 1930), American writer, feminist and social activist
Selma Aliye Kavaf (born 1962), Turkish politician
Selma Kurz (1874–1933), Austrian/German operatic soprano
Selma Lagerlöf (1858–1940), Swedish author
Selma Meerbaum-Eisinger (1924–1942), Romanian-born German-language poet
Selma Mayer (1884–1984), Israeli nurse known as Schwester Selma
Selma Meyer (1890–1941), Dutch-Jewish women's rights activist
Selma Yağcı (born 1981), Turkish boxer

Surname
Bartolomé de Selma y Salaverde (c. 1595 – after 1638), Spanish composer and dulcian player
Dick Selma (1943–2001), American baseball player
Mai Selma (11th century), last Duguwa king of the Kanem Empire

Fictional characters

Selma Bouvier, The Simpsons character voiced by Julie Kavner
Selma Jezková, fictional character in the Lars von Trier film Dancer in the Dark played by Björk

Citations

Sources

English-language feminine given names
English feminine given names
Estonian feminine given names
Danish feminine given names
German feminine given names
Scandinavian feminine given names
Swedish feminine given names
Arabic feminine given names
Turkish feminine given names